Etli makarna  is a traditional pasta dish made in Turkey. They are made from meat and paste. It is prepared in Ottoman cuisine.

Varieties in Ottoman cuisine 
In the first Ottoman printed cookbook, Melceü't-Tabbâhîn, there is a recipe as İstofato kum makaronya (Meat pasta).

References

Turkish cuisine
Ottoman cuisine
Turkish pasta